A Hard Day (lit. "Take It to the End") is a 2014 South Korean action thriller film written and directed by Kim Seong-hun, and starring Lee Sun-kyun and Cho Jin-woong. It was selected to compete in the Directors' Fortnight section of the 2014 Cannes Film Festival.

Plot
Ko, a corrupt detective whose mother recently dies, learns that his squad is being investigated by internal affairs for bribery. As he drives from his mother's funeral to the station, he crashes into a homeless man wandering onto the road, killing him. Fearing manslaughter charges as he is intoxicated, Ko decides against calling the police and hides the body in his car trunk (just in time as a patrol car drives by). He returns to the funeral and hides the body inside his mother's coffin, only to realize later that the man's cell phone is still in the coffin. A few days later, to Ko and his squad's relief, the internal affairs' investigation is cancelled by a lieutenant named Park.

Ko's squad is then assigned to locate and arrest a wanted murderer named Lee, who Ko recognizes as the homeless man. While searching Lee's hideout, the squad meets a police officer who is investigating a hit-and-run incident. Lee's hideout is right next to the site of the collision, in vew of a traffic camera. The squad examines the low-quality camera footage, noting that the model of the colliding car is the same as Ko's. The triangulation of Lee's phone points to the area near Ko's mother's grave.

It is revealed that the driver of the patrol car who drove past Ko after he killed Lee was Park, the lieutenant who shut down the investigation into Ko's team. Although he witnessed Ko's collision, Park doesn't know where the body was. Instead of formally reporting Ko, Park blackmails him and demands possession of the body. Ko excavates the coffin, searches Lee and discovers bullet wounds on his body. Lee's cell phone receives a call from another criminal, whom Ko tracks down and interrogates. The criminal reveals that Park stole a large amount of confiscated cocaine. However, after storing his profits in a private vault, Lee stole the key and escaped. Park shot Lee and was chasing him when he was hit by Ko's car. When asked about the key, Ko finds out that anything important was always kept with Lee on his body.

Ko returns to the grave site and locates the key, but is arrested by his subordinate, who tailed him after discovering that Ko's car was damaged immediately after the time of Lee's death. The subordinate is killed when Park uses a crane to drop a shipping container onto his car. Ko gets ready to report on Park and turn in himself as well, but Park threatens to kill Ko's sister and daughter. Ko steals an explosive from the police basement and inserts it into Lee's body. He gives the body to Park and detonates the explosive, blasting Park's van off a bridge into a lake. Ko returns to his apartment and gets ready to report his crimes, but is attacked by Park, who survived the explosion. Park accidentally shoots and kills himself while trying to dislodge a revolver from a fallen bookshelf. Senior police officials decide to cover up Park's and Ko's crimes to protect their own reputations. Ko chooses to resign, and accesses Park's private vault using the key from Lee's body. He discovers an enormous reserve of cash, more than he could have imagined.

Cast
 Lee Sun-kyun as Detective Ko Gun-su
 Cho Jin-woong as Lieutenant Park Chang-min
 Shin Jung-geun as Chief 
 Jung Man-sik as Detective Choi Sang-ho
 Shin Dong-mi as Gun-su's younger sister
 Kim Dong-young as Detective Do Hee-chul
 Park Bo-gum as Officer Lee Jin-ho
 Joo Seok-tae as Detective Nam
 Heo Jung-eun as Mina
 Lee Jae-won as Jo Neung-hyun
 Jo Ha-seok as Lee Gwang-min
 Yoo Soon-woong as Funeral home director
 Lee Jang-yoo as Coffin rites instructor
 Jung Woo-hyuk as Funeral home security guard
 Byun Jung-hye as Funeral home female employee
 Jang In-sub as Officer Lee Dong-yun
 Bae Yoo-ram as Officer Shin Hyun-jin
 Kim Kyung-beom as Senior officer at DUI checkpoint
 Kim Seung-hoon as Taxi driver
 Kim Kang-hyun as Young-chul
 Song Young-gyu as Team leader of internal affairs
 Lee Ji-hoon as Officer in charge of police armory
 Nam Kyeong-eup as High ranking police official
 Kim Hae-gon as Piggybank owner 
 Baek Jong-hwan as Piggybank employee

Reception
The film debuted to stellar reviews at the 2014 Cannes Film Festival in the Director's Fortnight sidebar, where it was praised by critics as a well-made thriller with unrelenting suspense and flashes of humor. Upon its release in South Korea on May 29, 2014, at first it didn't attract much attention or hype, with a lackluster 80,000 ticket sales on its opening day. But through strong word of mouth from viewers, A Hard Day began an unexpectedly popular run at the box office, placing second place for four weeks behind Hollywood blockbusters X-Men: Days of Future Past and Edge of Tomorrow. It also outperformed other local noir thrillers with bigger stars, such as Man on High Heels and No Tears for the Dead. A Hard Day quickly reached its break-even point, garnering 1.6 million admissions 11 days after its release, and by its sixth week had drawn 3.08 million admissions. At the end of its run, A Hard Day had grossed  from 3,450,305 tickets sold.

Awards and nominations

Remakes
The film has been remade in China as Peace Breaker (2017), in the Philippines as A Hard Day (2021), in France as Restless (2022), and in Japan as Hard Days (2023).

References

External links
  
 
 
 

2014 films
2014 action thriller films
2014 crime thriller films
2014 black comedy films
2010s Korean-language films
South Korean black comedy films
South Korean action thriller films
South Korean crime action films
South Korean crime thriller films
Films about the illegal drug trade
Films about cocaine
Films directed by Kim Seong-hun
2014 crime action films
South Korean films remade in other languages
2010s South Korean films